Stimme des Stoßbrigadlers ('Voice of the Strike Force') was a Volga German communist newspaper, published from Krasny Kut between 1932 and 1937. Stimme des Stoßbrigadlers was the joint organ of the Krasny Kut local committee of the All-Union Communist Party (bolshevik) and the Krasny Kut Executive Committee.

References

German-language communist newspapers
Newspapers published in the Soviet Union